Oswald West State Park is part of the state park system of the U.S. state of Oregon.

The state park also contains Neahkahnie Mountain, Short Sand Beach, Short Sand Creek, Necarney Creek, Cape Falcon, Smugglers Cove and the Oregon Coast Trail. The cove is a popular surf destination and is known as "Short Sands". Urban legend claims pirate treasure is buried near Smugglers Cove but has never been found.

History
The park was named after Oswald West, the 14th Governor of Oregon and the man who led preserving Oregon's beaches for public use. A memorial marker for Matt Kramer, a journalist whose articles helped shift public opinion to preserve the beaches, sits at the trail divide between Short Sands beach and Cape Falcon.

Marine Reserve
On January 1, 2016, the Cape Falcon Marine Reserve and Marine Protected Area went into effect off the shores of Oswald West State Park. The marine reserve includes the nearshore out to approximately 2 miles out into the ocean. The following activities are unlawful to undertake in the marine reserve: Take of any fish, invertebrate, or wildlife species; Take of kelp or other seaweeds; and Deployment of fishing gear. The marine protected area is the two miles out through the state waters line (3 nautical miles out). The restrictions are the same, except people may take salmon by troll and crab.

Camping
Oswald West is currently a day-use area only, though the park historically had 30 walk-in tent sites. The campsite was surrounded by giant old-growth Sitka spruce, Douglas-fir, western hemlock and western red cedar, as well as smaller brush including red huckleberry, salmonberry and salal bushes.

During the Summer of 2008, a large Sitka Spruce fell with no warning in the campground. The state immediately conducted a survey of other trees in the park and determined there were several other trees that could fall at any moment. Subsequently, the Oregon Parks and Recreation Department decided to close the campground indefinitely citing public safety. Although camping is currently not permitted, the park is still open with full day-use access.

Gallery

See also
 List of Oregon state parks

References

External links

 
 

State parks of Oregon
Parks in Tillamook County, Oregon